Two Ton class is an offshore sailing class of the International Offshore Rule. The Two Ton Cup is held by the Royal Ocean Racing Club as part of its Admiral's Cup.

See also
Mini Ton class
Quarter Ton class
Half Ton class
Three-Quarter Ton class
One Ton class
Midget Ocean Racing Club

References

Development sailing classes
Keelboats